Voous could refer to:

 Dutch ornithologist, Karel Voous
 the "List of Recent Holarctic Bird Species", of which he was the author